Hydrelia terraenovae is a moth in the family Geometridae first described by Harry Krogerus in 1954. It is found in Canada.

References

Moths described in 1954
Asthenini
Moths of North America